Sir William Henry Horwood  (November 5, 1862 – April 7, 1945) was a politician and the Chief Justice of Newfoundland and Labrador from 1902 to 1944. He represented Trinity from 1894 to 1897 and from 1900 to 1902 and Harbour Grace from 1897 to 1900 in the Newfoundland House of Assembly.

Born in St. John's, Horwood was educated at Bishop Feild College and went on to study law. He was called to the Newfoundland bar in 1885. In 1895, he was named Queen's Counsel. He was first elected to the Newfoundland assembly in a by-election held in 1894. Horwood was a member of the Executive Council from 1894 to 1897 and from 1900 to 1902. He was Colonial Secretary from 1894 to 1895 and Minister of Justice and Attorney General from 1900 to 1902. In 1895, he was a Newfoundland delegate to a conference in Ottawa to discuss confederation with Canada. Horwood resigned from cabinet and the assembly upon being named Chief Justice in July 1902.

On December 19, 1904, Horwood was named a Knights Bachelor.

He was appointed president of the Newfoundland branch of St. John Ambulance following its initiation in April 1910.

In 1908, Horwood married Julia Hutchinson. He was named a Knight Commander in the Order of St Michael and St George in 1944.  He died in St. John's at the age of 82.

References

1862 births
1945 deaths
Knights Commander of the Order of St Michael and St George
Members of the Executive Council of Newfoundland and Labrador
Bishop Feild School alumni
Newfoundland Colony judges
Colonial Secretaries of Newfoundland
Attorneys-General of Newfoundland Colony